The Progressive Bloc is an electoral alliance in the Dominican Republic. The alliance is led by the Dominican Liberation Party and gained an absolute majority in the 16 May 2006 legislative election. 

Political party alliances in the Dominican Republic